Hidetaka Kawagoe (川越 英隆, born April 8, 1973), nicknamed "Goe", is a former Nippon Professional Baseball pitcher.

References

External links

1973 births
Living people
Aoyama Gakuin University alumni
Chiba Lotte Marines players
Japanese baseball coaches
Japanese baseball players
Nippon Professional Baseball coaches
Nippon Professional Baseball pitchers
Orix BlueWave players
Orix Buffaloes players
People from Sagamihara